Petros III may refer to:

 Pope Peter III of Alexandria, ruled in 477–489
 Michael Petros III Kasparian, ruled in 1753–1780